Heather Meyer is an American politician serving as a member of the Kansas House of Representatives from the 29th district. She assumed office on September 7, 2021, after the resignation of her predecessor, Brett Parker.

Early life and education 
Meyer was born in Kansas City, Missouri and raised in Kansas by a single father. She attended Johnson County Community College and received her Bachelor of Social Work from the University of Kansas.

Personal life 
Meyer is married and has two children. She is openly bisexual.

References 

Living people
University of Kansas alumni
LGBT state legislators in Kansas
Democratic Party members of the Kansas House of Representatives
Politicians from Overland Park, Kansas
21st-century American women politicians
Bisexual politicians
1980 births
21st-century American politicians